Vivek Mishra (born 8 September 1986) is an Indian gymnast from Allahabad, Uttar Pradesh. He has represented India in such international competitions as the 2006 Commonwealth Games and the 2006 Asian Games. He was one of five gymnasts from Allahabad named to the gymnastics team for the 2010 Commonwealth Games but was unable to compete because of a shin bone fracture. 

Mishra received a 2008-09 Laxman award for his athletic achievements at the national and international level. Award winners receive a bronze statue, a scroll, and a cash award of 50,000 rupees.

References

Indian male artistic gymnasts
1986 births
Living people
Sportspeople from Allahabad
Gymnasts at the 2006 Asian Games
Gymnasts at the 2006 Commonwealth Games
Commonwealth Games competitors for India
Asian Games competitors for India